David Porter (born 3 October 1953 in Balaklava, South Australia) is an Australian sport shooter. He competed at the 2000 Summer Olympics in the men's 50 metre pistol event, in which he tied for 20th place, and the men's 10 metre air pistol event, in which he placed 38th.

References

1953 births
Living people
ISSF pistol shooters
Australian male sport shooters
Olympic shooters of Australia
Shooters at the 2000 Summer Olympics